Tysvær Bygdeblad is a Norwegian weekly newspaper, published in Aksdal, Norway, and covering the municipality of Tysvær. The newspaper was founded in 1975, and its first editor was Lars Olav Tunbø. The newspaper is issued once a week. It had a circulation of 2,180 in 2013. Its editor is Alf Einar Kvalavåg.

References

1975 establishments in Norway
Mass media in Rogaland
Tysvær
Newspapers established in 1975
Newspapers published in Norway